In Greek mythology, Eurypyle (Ancient Greek: Εὐρυπύλην) was a maenad. She was a follower of Dionysus and was killed by Morrheus.

Note

References 

 Nonnus of Panopolis, Dionysiaca translated by William Henry Denham Rouse (1863-1950), from the Loeb Classical Library, Cambridge, MA, Harvard University Press, 1940.  Online version at the Topos Text Project.
 Nonnus of Panopolis, Dionysiaca. 3 Vols. W.H.D. Rouse. Cambridge, MA., Harvard University Press; London, William Heinemann, Ltd. 1940-1942. Greek text available at the Perseus Digital Library.

Maenads
Companions of Dionysus
Women in Greek mythology